Singapore Squash Rackets Association (SSRA) is the national governing body for squash in Singapore. The body was founded in 1970.

References

External links
 

National members of the World Squash Federation
Squash in Singapore
Squash
1970 establishments in Singapore
Sports organizations established in 1970